WDLV (88.7 FM) is a non-commercial contemporary Christian-format radio station licensed to serve Fort Myers, Florida. The station is part of Educational Media Foundation's K-Love network.

History
88.7 FM was first founded by Bob and Felice Augsburg as WAYJ, a Contemporary Christian music (CCM)-format station, as a way to expand messages about Christianity to a younger audience, following the success of their weekly program for youth on another local Christian station, WSOR. The first station and former flagship of the WAY-FM Network, after establishing additional stations, the WAY-FM group would relocate its corporate offices to Colorado Springs, Colorado in 2001.

Sales
On February 14, 2012, it was announced that Classical South Florida was in the process of acquiring WAYJ from WAY-FM for $4.35 million. Following the announcement of the sale, WAY-FM announced that they would acquire competing station WSRX 89.5 from the Family Church of Marco Island; this move was designed to continue WAY-FM programming in its legacy Southwest Florida market. In the interim, programming from WAYJ began simulcasting on WSRX on March 1, 2012.

Upon completion of the sale on June 7, 2012, WAYJ's call sign was changed to WNPS, and the WAYJ call sign was assumed by WSRX 89.5 on June 18, 2012.

On July 17, 2015, WNPS was sold to Educational Media Foundation and switched to EMF's K-Love under new call letters, WDLV. In consequence, the CCM format, which is featured on K-Love, resumed at 88.7 FM after three years, but now competing with the former occupant of 88.7, WAYJ. Following this switch of formats, the prior K-Love affiliate in the Fort Myers area, 98.5 FM WLVO, became affiliated with Radio Nueva Vida, EMF's Spanish-language network. EMF's purchase of WDLV, along with co-owned WFLV, WMLV, W214BD, and W270AD, was consummated on November 2, 2015, at a price of $21.7 million.

References

External links

Radio stations established in 1988
Mass media in Fort Myers, Florida
K-Love radio stations
1987 establishments in Florida
Educational Media Foundation radio stations
DLV